Monica Gallagher may refer to:

Monica Gallagher (comics artist), comics artist
Monica Gallagher (fictional character), character in Shameless
 Dame Monica Gallagher (community worker) (1923–2013)